Lophocampa margona is a moth of the family Erebidae. It was described by William Schaus in 1896. It is found in Mexico.

Description
Body chrome yellow, the patagia, inwardly shaded with brown. Primaries acute with outer margin straight and oblique; yellow, the inner margin dark brown; fine wavy brown lines cross the wings, very indistinct at the base; the outer and submarginal lines double, filled in with a slightly darker shade than the ground color and the submarginal line ceases at vein 5; a terminal row of darker spots edged with brownish between the veins; a dark spot at the end of the cell. Secondaries whitish yellow. Expanse, 52 mm.

References

 

margona
Moths described in 1896